Fieldia australiana is a species of flowering plant in the family Gesneriaceae. It is a small tree from eastern Australian rainforests. It has also been placed as the sole species in the monotypic genus Lenbrassia.

References

Gesnerioideae
Flora of Queensland